Harry Houghton (9 January 1901 – 12 June 1986) was a British athlete who competed at the 1924 Summer Olympics and the 1928 Summer Olympics.

References

1901 births
1986 deaths
Sportspeople from Preston, Lancashire
Athletes (track and field) at the 1924 Summer Olympics
Athletes (track and field) at the 1928 Summer Olympics
British middle-distance runners
Olympic athletes of Great Britain
20th-century British people